India competed at the 1968 Summer Olympics in Mexico City, Mexico. 25 competitors, all men, took part in 11 events in 5 sports.

Competitors

Medalists

Bronze

Field hockey, Men's Team Competition. Team members:

 Ajit Pal Singh
 Balbir Singh I (b. 5 April 1945 in Sansarpur)
 Balbir Singh II (b. 27 February 1941 in Sansarpur)
 Balbir Singh III (b. 21 September 1945 in Faisalabad)
 Gurbux Singh
 Harbinder Singh
 Harmik Singh
 Inam-ur Rahman
 Inder Singh
 Krishnamurthy Perumal
 Munir Sait
 John Victor Peter
 Prithipal Singh
 Rajendra Absolem Christy
 Tarsem Singh

Athletics

 Men's Hammer Throw
Praveen Kumar Sobti
 Qualification Round — 60.84(→ 20th place)

Hockey

Shooting

Two shooters represented India in 1968.

Trap
Karni Singh
 Qualification Round — 194(→ 10th place)

Randhir Singh
 Qualification Round — 192(→ 17th place)

Skeet
Karni Singh
 Qualification Round — 187(→ 28th place)

Weightlifting

Wrestling

Men's Freestyle

Men's Greco-Roman

References

External links
Official Olympic Reports
International Olympic Committee results database

Nations at the 1968 Summer Olympics
1968